Call of the Pharaoh is a mobile game from Cellufun with a strong community aspect.

Gameplay
In the game, thousands of players within Cellufun's mobile community compete to build the biggest pyramids. Players must cooperate with others to get the building materials and manpower they need to further advance their pyramid.

Awards
Call of the Pharaoh was awarded a joint win in the "Best Mobile Game" category at the Global Mobile Awards 2008.

References

Mobile games